The Pipeline Mosque is the main mosque of Serekunda, The Gambia.

History 
The mosque was built on 28th February 1990.

Location and architecture 
The mosque is located on the western side of Kairaba Avenue (former name: Pipeline Road) in Serekunda. The external dimensions of the mosque are around 30 × 65 meters. The mosque has the features of an Islamic architecture such as a minaret and a facade. The mosque is closer to the Embassy of the USA in Banjul.

References 

Islam in the Gambia
Mosques in Africa
Religious buildings and structures in the Gambia
Serekunda